Kahnuj (also Romanized as Kahnūj; also known as Kahnow) is a village in Pa Qaleh Rural District, in the Central District of Shahr-e Babak County, Kerman Province, Iran. At the 2006 census, its population was 141, in 36 families.

References 

Populated places in Shahr-e Babak County